Songal is a neighbourhood in the Malir district of Karachi, Pakistan, that previously was a part of Gadap Town until 2011.

There are several ethnic groups in Songal including Muhajirs, Sindhis, Punjabis, Kashmiris, Seraikis, Pakhtuns, Balochis, Memons, Bohras, Ismailis and Christians.

References

Neighbourhoods of Karachi
Gadap Town